The 1968 Open Championship was the 97th Open Championship, played 10–13 July at Carnoustie Golf Links in Angus, Scotland. Gary Player won the second of his three Open titles, two strokes ahead of runners-up Bob Charles and Jack Nicklaus. It was the fifth of Player's nine major titles.

This Open introduced the second cut at 54 holes, used through 1985. In addition, starting with this Championship all past Open champions were exempt from qualifying (though, eventually, an age restriction was placed on past champions).

The inaugural Greater Milwaukee Open was held in the United States during the same week, with a first prize of $40,000, over five times the winner's share of the Open Championship, which was $7,200 (£3,000).

The PGA Championship was played the next week in San Antonio, Texas, the fifth and final time in the 1960s that these two majors were played in consecutive weeks in July. The PGA Championship moved permanently to August in 1969 (except 1971, when it was played in late February) and remained there until 2019, when it moved to May between The Masters and U.S. Open.

Course
Carnoustie Golf Links -
Championship Course

Past champions in the field

Made both cuts

Missed the first cut

Round summaries

First round
Wednesday, 10 July 1968

Second round
Thursday, 11 July 1968

Amateurs: Bonallack (+3), Monguzzi (+8), O'Connor (+12), Sweeny Jr (+12), Shade (+13), Oosterhuis (+16), Saddler (+16).

Third round
Friday, 13 July 1968

Amateurs: Bonallack (+5), Monguzzi (+18).

Final round
Saturday, 13 July 1968

Amateurs: Bonallack (+12).

References

External links
Carnoustie 1968 (Official site)

The Open Championship
Golf tournaments in Scotland
Sport in Angus, Scotland
Open Championship
Open Championship
Open Championship